Saint-Amandin is a commune in the Cantal department in south-central France.

Geography
The river Rhue forms all of the commune's northern border.

Population

See also
Communes of the Cantal department

References

Communes of Cantal
Cantal communes articles needing translation from French Wikipedia